Nitcho Reinhardt (born 22 April 1988 in Verdun, France) is a French Gypsy jazz guitarist and composer.

Biography 
Living in Verdun, Reinhardt picked up the guitar at 15 years of age. He released his debut album Latcho Dives in 2008 and in 2011 the album Une Histoire with his brothers Tony and Youri Reinhardt on rhythm guitar in addition to bassist Thierry Chanteloup. With his own Nitcho Reinhardt Trio including with Thierry Chanteloup and Benji Winterstein, he released the album Geronimo in 2018.

Discography 
 2008: Latcho Dives
 2011: Une Histoire
 2018: Geronimo

References

External links 
 
 Nitcho Reinhardt Trio "Nine by Nine" Septembre 2018

Living people
1988 births
French jazz guitarists
French jazz composers
21st-century guitarists
21st-century French musicians